The 2007–08 Cleveland State Vikings men's basketball team represents Cleveland State University in the 2007-08 NCAA Division I men's basketball season. The team was led by second-year head coach Gary Waters. In 2006–07, the Vikings finished 10–21 (3–13 in the Horizon League). Cleveland State had their first winning season since the 2000–2001 season when they finished 19–13 overall and 9–5 in conference play. It was the 77th season of Cleveland State basketball.

Preseason 
The preseason Horizon League Coaches' Poll picked the Vikings to finish ninth. The Vikings bring in ten newcomers to this year's roster. J'Nathan Bullock was named to the preseason all-Horizon League 2nd team. Also for the first time since the 1986–1987 season the Vikings are guaranteed to play at least 32 games. At least 17 of those games will be on the road.

Regular season 
On January 5, 2008 Cleveland State matched their win totals from last season (10–21 overall, 3–13 HL), and remain in first place in the Horizon League through 15 games for the first time since the 1999–2000 season. They are the last undefeated team in Horizon League play at 4–0. On January 12, 2008 Cleveland State won its 5th game in conference play. That is its best start in conference play since the 1992–93 season when they won their first 14 conference games. The Vikings were 1–26 in games against ranked opponents, with their only win coming on March 14, 1986, against No. 16 Indiana in the NCAA tournament under coach Kevin Mackey until their 56–52 win over No. 12 Butler on January 17, 2008. The 5,352 fans that attended the game marked the largest crowd in the Wolstein Center since the curtain was added four years ago on the west side to trim the capacity of the building to approximately 8,500. The last time CSU had a larger crowd in the Wolstein Center came on November 29, 2003 when 11,534 saw the Vikings drop an 82–76 decision to No. 9 North Carolina (No. 10 ESPN/USA Today; No. 9 AP). On January 21, 2008 Cleveland State received their first point in the AP Top 25 poll for the season, that had them T-43. The lone point came from Keith Sargeant of the Home News Tribune. On March 1, 2008 Cleveland State clinched the 2nd seed in the Horizon League tournament with a win over Youngstown State and a Wright State loss. With the 2nd seed they only need to win two games to make the NCAA Tournament. They will host the championship game with a win and a Butler loss in the tournament. Also with the win Cleveland State reached the 20-win mark for only the six time in Cleveland State history. On March 8, 2008 Cleveland State reached their first Horizon League championship game ever, and their first conference championship game appearance since 1987.

Schedule

References 

Cleveland State Vikings men's basketball seasons
Cleveland State
Cleveland State
Viking
Viking